Bythewood is an uncommon surname. Notable people with the surname include:

 Dennis Bythewood, American program executive officer
 Reggie Rock Bythewood (born 1965), American producer, screenwriter, director, and actor
 Gina Prince-Bythewood (born 1969), American director, screenwriter, and producer